Lucas Zoilo Saldombide Astol (October 26, 1903 (March 18, 1905 according to other sources) - December 4, 1981) was a Uruguayan footballer. He was part of the team that won the first ever World Cup in 1930 for Uruguay, but he did not play any matches in the tournament. He was a club player of Montevideo Wanderers and Nacional.

References

External links
 World Cup Champions Squads 1930 - 2002
 O nascimento da mítica Celeste Olímpica 
 
 
 
 

1900s births
1981 deaths
People from Santa Lucía, Uruguay
Uruguayan people of Basque descent
Footballers from Montevideo
Uruguayan footballers
Uruguay international footballers
1930 FIFA World Cup players
FIFA World Cup-winning players
Uruguayan Primera División players
Montevideo Wanderers F.C. players
Club Nacional de Football players
Olympic footballers of Uruguay
Olympic gold medalists for Uruguay
Footballers at the 1924 Summer Olympics
Olympic medalists in football
Copa América-winning players
Association football forwards
Medalists at the 1924 Summer Olympics